Rhaphitropis is a genus of beetles belonging to the family Anthribidae.

The species of this genus are found in Europe and Japan.

Species:
 Rhaphitropis acutedentata Frieser, 1987 
 Rhaphitropis angustula Frieser, 1995

References

Anthribidae